Happy New Year, Charlie Brown! is the 30th prime-time animated television special based upon the popular comic strip Peanuts, by Charles M. Schulz. It aired on the CBS network on January 1, 1986. The special focuses on Charlie Brown's difficulty finishing a book report over the holidays. It was the last film made by Bernard Gruver, following his death on June 14, 1985, and it was considered to be his posthumous farewell. Another New Year's special Snoopy Presents: For Auld Lang Syne was released on Apple TV+ on December 10, 2021.

Plot
While all the kids are happy that they get time off for Christmas vacation, Charlie Brown dreads how his teacher at the last minute assigned a book report on War and Peace by Leo Tolstoy. There is one major distraction on his mind, the big New Year's party all his friends are attending, with Peppermint Patty continuously convincing him to attend. Charlie tries inviting the object of his desires, the Little Red-Haired Girl, but gets his hand caught in the mail slot. With the party on his mind, he attempts to try to find another way to write the report, even going to a bookstore to find an audiobook and computer game of it, all to no avail. While at the party, he tries to finish the book on the front porch of the house, but falls asleep and misses the clock's striking of midnight but is more devastated when Linus reveals that he ended up dancing with the Little Red-Haired Girl, who showed up after all. At the end of the special, Charlie hands his book report to the teacher and gets a D minus. Despite the poor grade, Charlie Brown is proud that he made an honest effort and avoided an outright failure. However, the teacher announces that the entire class will be made to read and report on Fyodor Dostoevsky's Crime and Punishment, overwhelming him even more.

Cast
 Chad Allen as Charlie Brown
 Jeremy Miller as Linus van Pelt
 Melissa Guzzi as Lucy van Pelt
 Kristie Baker as Peppermint Patty
 Elizabeth Lyn Fraser as Sally Brown
 Aron Mandelbaum as Schroeder
 Jason Mendelson as Marcie
 Bill Melendez as Snoopy, Woodstock
 Desirée Goyette as singer ("Slow Slow Quick Quick")
Note: Franklin, the Little Red-Haired Girl, Patty, Pig-Pen, Rerun, and Violet appear but are silent.

Home media
The special was released on VHS by Kartes Video Communications in 1987 and by Paramount Home Video on September 28, 1994. Paramount would re-release the VHS in clamshell packaging on October 1, 1996. Warner Home Video released the special on DVD on October 6, 2009 as a bonus feature for the Remastered Deluxe Edition of I Want a Dog for Christmas, Charlie Brown.

It was re-released as part of the box set Snoopy's Holiday Collection on October 1, 2013.

References

External links
 

Peanuts television specials
Television shows directed by Bill Melendez
Television shows directed by Sam Jaimes
1986 television specials
1980s American television specials
1980s animated television specials
New Year's television specials
Television shows written by Charles M. Schulz